Vicky Ratnani is an Indian chef. He has a cooking show on NDTV called Vicky Goes Veg, as well as a cookbook by the same name. He also has a cooking show on LivingFoodz called "vickypedia". He won the best Indian Chef of the Year 2015.

References

Indian chefs
Living people
Writers from Mumbai
Year of birth missing (living people)